Mason Welch Gross (June 3, 1911 – October 11, 1977) was an American television quiz show personality and academic who served as the sixteenth President of Rutgers University, serving from 1959 to 1971.

Biography
He was born in Hartford, Connecticut in 1911 to Hilda Frances Welch (c. 1880-1962) and Charles Welles Gross (1877–1957). He had two siblings: Spencer Gross (1906–1982) and Cornelia Gross (1914-?). Charles Gross was an attorney. Mason started in the Hartford public grade school system and two years at Hartford High School. He then entered the Taft School, a preparatory school in Watertown, Connecticut in 1925. In 1927 he became ill following his inoculation for scarlet fever. He missed a year of school and spent part of the year at a ranch belonging to his mother's cousin in Arizona.

Mason earned his Bachelor of Arts in 1934; and Master of Arts degree in classics in 1937, at Jesus College, University of Cambridge. While there he rowed under the legendary Steve Fairbairn.

He returned to the United States and studied at Harvard University under Alfred North Whitehead, earning his PhD in 1938. He taught at Columbia University from 1938 to 1942, where he met Julia Kernan, a Vassar graduate, and they married on September 6, 1940. They had four children together: Ellen Clarissa Gross who married Frank A. Miles, Katharine Wood Gross who married Clayton H. Farnham, Charles Welles Gross, and Thomas Welch Gross.

He then served in World War II in the Army Intelligence Corps, and was assigned to a bomber group based in Italy. Gross earned the Bronze Star, and was later discharged as a Captain.

He then became Assistant Professor of Philosophy and Assistant to the Dean of Arts and Science at Rutgers University in 1946. In 1947 he was promoted to assistant dean and associate professor, and in 1949 was appointed to the newly created position of provost to take over the duties of the ailing Robert Clarkson Clothier who took a leave of absence. Clothier resigned his office in 1951 and  Gross continued as provost under the newly appointed Lewis Webster Jones. He was then given the additional title of vice president in 1958. Jones resigned the presidency in August 1958, and in February 1959, Gross was chosen as president. On May 6, 1959, he became the sixteenth president of Rutgers University.

From 1949 to 1950 he was a panelist on the television quiz show, Think Fast. He was also a judge for the show, Two for the Money from 1952 to 1955.  

He oversaw large-scale development on all the University's campuses, including the development of Livingston College from the Army's former Camp Kilmer. Gross served during turbulent times with student protests over the Vietnam War which saw the Rutgers ROTC building burned, and race riots in nearby Newark, New Jersey in 1967.

During this time, Gross received recognition for refusing to dismiss Eugene Genovese, a professor who early during the Vietnam War publicly supported the Viet Cong and welcomed their victory in Southeast Asia. During his tenure Rutgers University acquired the Center of Alcohol Studies in 1962, formerly housed at Yale University since the 1920s, and established a medical school.

In 1971, after 25 years of service, 12 as the university president, he retired. He then became the director of the Harry Frank Guggenheim Foundation and served until his death. At the time of his death, he was a resident of Rumson, New Jersey.

He died in Riverview Hospital in Red Bank, New Jersey, at age 66 in 1977.

Legacy
The School for the Creative and Performing Arts at Rutgers was renamed as the Mason Gross School of the Arts in 1979 in his honor.

In 1980 Rutgers University Press published The Selected Speeches of Mason Welch Gross.

Timeline
1911 Birth in Hartford, Connecticut
1920  Hartford, Connecticut
1925 Attends Taft School in Watertown, Connecticut
1934 B.A. from Jesus College, Cambridge
1937 M.A. in classics from Jesus College, Cambridge
1938 Ph.D. from Harvard University
1938 Begins as instructor at Columbia University
1940 Marriage to Julia Kernan
1942 Ends as instructor at Columbia University
1942 Begins Army Intelligence Corps in Italy during World War II
1945 Ends Army Intelligence Corps
1946 Assistant professor of philosophy and assistant to the dean of the College of Arts and Science at Rutgers University
1949 Promoted to Full Professor at Rutgers University and made provost to Robert Clarkson Clothier
1949 Begins as panelist on Think Fast
1950 Ends as panelist on Think Fast
1951 Robert Clothier resigns and Lewis Webster Jones becomes president
1952 Begins tenure as judge on Two for the Money
1955 Ends tenure as judge on Two for the Money
1958 Vice Presidency of Rutgers University
1958 Lewis Webster Jones resigns in August
1959 Presidency of Rutgers University on May 6
1971 Retired from Rutgers University
1975 Mason Gross School of the Arts created
1977 Death in Red Bank, New Jersey

Organizations

Board of directors
Vassar College
Taft School
Middlesex General Hospital

Trustee
American Cancer Society
Mediation Board of New Jersey
National Association of State Universities and Land Grant Colleges

References

Sources
New York Times; August 8, 1954, Sunday; Dr. Mason Gross Judges Quiz Player's Answers. The quiet-spoken, scholarly gentleman seated adjacent to the Quizmaster on C. B. S. television's "Two for the Money" show is Dr. Mason Gross, Professor of Philosophy at Rutgers University, and a one-man television brain trust. ...
New York Times; February 28, 1959; Gross Named Rutgers President; Scholar Once a TV Personality; Arbiter of Quiz Show Joined Faculty in 1946.  Taught Classes in Philosophy. Dr. Gross Named Head of Rutgers. Joint Announcement Noted as Speaker. New Brunswick, New Jersey, February 27, 1959; Dr. Mason W. Gross, a 47-year-old scholar, philosophy professor and former television personality, was named today as the sixteenth president of Rutgers University. ...
New York Times; May 7, 1959, Thursday; The new president of Rutgers University, Dr. Mason Welch Gross, is known on the campus at New Brunswick, New Jersey, as a man of unflagging ability. He has demonstrated it in many ways. ...

External links
Rutgers Leaders, Rutgers History: Mason W. Gross (at the Rutgers University website)
Inventory to the Records of the Rutgers University Office of the President (Mason Welch Gross), 1936, 1945-1971 (at Special Collections and University Archives, Rutgers University)
The Mason Gross School of the Arts
Mason Gross memorial

1911 births
1977 deaths
Taft School alumni
Alumni of Jesus College, Cambridge
United States Army Air Forces personnel of World War II
Harvard University alumni
Columbia University faculty
Educators from Hartford, Connecticut
People from Rumson, New Jersey
Presidents of Rutgers University
United States Army Air Forces officers
Military personnel from New Jersey
20th-century American academics